Takis Loukanidis (25 September 1937 – 11 January 2018) was a Greek footballer of the 1950s–60s.

Career
Born in Paranesti, a village in the broader area of Drama, Loukanidis' father was killed by Bulgarian armed forces and soon after he was placed in an orphanage at age 10. He began playing football with the youth side of AEK Komotini, and joined the senior team of Doxa Drama F.C. in 1955.

He soon attracted the interest of major clubs in Greece and abroad, including Juventus F.C. Finally, Antonis Mantzevelakis brought him to Panathinaikos via APOEL in Cyprus. Takis Loukanidis made his debut on 28 March 1962 against AEK Athens (score: 2-3). In the following match, on 1 April 1962, he scored his first goal with Panathinaikos, helping them beat Proodeftiki 5–0. He ended his career at Aris Thessaloniki, where he won the Greek Cup in 1970.

Loukanidis made 23 appearances and scored three goals for the Greece national team from 1958 to 1967. He made his debut in a 1-7 1960 European Nations' Cup qualifying defeat to France on 1 October 1958.

Death
Loukanidis died on 11 January 2018 in Athens due to a myocardial infarction. He was 80.
Panathinaikos released a statement on their official website, paying tribute:

Honours
Doxa Dramas
Greek Cup: 1958 (runner-up), 1959 (runner-up)

Panathinaikos
Greek Championship: 1962, 1964, 1965, 1969
Greek Cup: 1967, 1969

Aris
Greek Cup: 1970

References

External links

1937 births
2018 deaths
Greek footballers
Greece international footballers
Super League Greece players
Doxa Drama F.C. players
Panathinaikos F.C. players
Aris Thessaloniki F.C. players
Association football midfielders

Panserraikos F.C. managers
Greek football managers
People from Drama (regional unit)
Footballers from Eastern Macedonia and Thrace